The 1969–70 Auburn Tigers men's basketball team represented Auburn University in the 1969–70 college basketball season. The team's head coach was Bill Lynn, who was in his seventh season at Auburn. The team played their home games at Memorial Coliseum in Auburn, Alabama. They finished the season 15–11, 11–7 in SEC play.

References

Auburn Tigers men's basketball seasons
Auburn
Auburn Tigers
Auburn Tigers